= East Las Vegas =

East Las Vegas may refer to one of three places in the United States of America:

- An area of the City of Las Vegas, Neveda
- Whitney, Nevada, formerly called East Las Vegas
- A former town in New Mexico, now part of Las Vegas, New Mexico.
